The  was a political party in Japan.

History
The party was established on 16 November 1945 by a group of 273 MPs, of whom 89 had been Rikken Minseitō members and 46 from Rikken Seiyūkai; many had been elected with the backing of the Imperial Rule Assistance Association in the 1942 elections. Machida Chūji was appointed party president after the post was turned down by Keizo Shibusawa. Due to it high proportion of members involved in wartime politics, it was the most affected party in the post-war purge, with 238 MPs and all but one its central committee members barred from politics.

In the 1946 elections the party won 110 seats, becoming the second-largest party in the House of Representatives. It was given four ministerial positions in the Liberal Party government led by Shigeru Yoshida, including Kijūrō Shidehara, who was selected as the party's new leader following the elections.

Talks later in the year with the Cooperative Democratic Party about a merger failed, as did efforts in February 1947 to negotiate a merger with the Liberal Party, although a few Liberal MPs led by Hitoshi Ashida subsequently joined the JPP, together with a group from the National Cooperative Party. At the end of March the decision was taken to dissolved the JPP and form the Democratic Party.

Election results

House of Representatives

References

Defunct political parties in Japan
Political parties established in 1945
1945 establishments in Japan
Political parties disestablished in 1947
1947 disestablishments in Japan